Rhagada gibbensis is a species of air-breathing land snail, a terrestrial pulmonate gastropod mollusk in the family Camaenidae. This species is endemic to Australia.

References

Gastropods of Australia
gibbensis
Vulnerable fauna of Australia
Gastropods described in 1985
Taxonomy articles created by Polbot